The 1888–89 season was Blackburn Rovers's first season in the Football League which had just been founded. Because of this they became one of the founder members of the Football League. They finished in 4th position with 26 points.

Final league table

Key: P = Matches played; W = Matches won; D = Matches drawn; L = Matches lost; F = Goals for; A = Goals against; GA = Goal average; Pts = Points

Results

Blackburn Rovers's score comes first

Legend

Football League

FA Cup

Appearances

See also
1888–89 in English football
List of Blackburn Rovers F.C. seasons

References

Blackburn Rovers F.C. seasons
Blackburn